Louisa Jane Hamilton, Duchess of Abercorn, VA (née Lady Louisa Jane Russell; 8 July 1812 – 31 March 1905) was a member of the British aristocracy. She was the half-sister of Prime Minister John Russell, 1st Earl Russell.

Biography
She was the wife of James Hamilton, 1st Duke of Abercorn, and the daughter of John Russell, 6th Duke of Bedford, by his second wife, Lady Georgiana Gordon. She was the mother of Louisa Montagu Douglas Scott, Duchess of Buccleuch and James Hamilton, 2nd Duke of Abercorn.

Early life, marriage, and family
Lady Louisa Jane Russell was born on Wednesday, 8 July 1812. She was the sixth child of eight, and a second daughter for John Russell, 6th Duke of Bedford and Lady Georgiana Gordon.

On Thursday, 25 October 1832, at Gordon Castle, in Morayshire, Scotland, Louisa married James Hamilton, 2nd Marquess of Abercorn, the son of James Hamilton, Viscount Hamilton, and Harriet Douglas. Louisa and James had fourteen children, among them seven daughters, all of whom were ordered to marry into the peerage and no one beneath the rank of an earl:
Lady Harriett Georgiana Louisa Hamilton (6 July 1834 – 23 April 1913), married 10 April 1855 Thomas Anson, 2nd Earl of Lichfield, and had issue
Lady Beatrix Frances Hamilton (21 July 1835 – 21 January 1871), married in London 23 May 1854 George Lambton, 2nd Earl of Durham, and had issue
Lady Louisa Jane Hamilton (26 August 1836 – 16 March 1912), married in London 22 November 1859 William Montagu Douglas Scott, 6th Duke of Buccleuch, and had issue
James Hamilton, 2nd Duke of Abercorn (24 August 1838 – 3 January 1913)
Lady Katherine Elizabeth Hamilton (9 January 1840 – 3 September 1874), married 26 October 1858 William Edgcumbe, 4th Earl of Mount Edgcumbe, and had issue
Lady Georgiana Susan Hamilton (7 July 1841 – 23 March 1913), married in London 16 March 1882 Edward Turnour, 5th Earl Winterton, and had issue
Lord Claud John Hamilton (20 February 1843 – 26 January 1925)
Lord George Francis Hamilton (17 December 1845 – 22 September 1927)
Lady Albertha Frances Anne Hamilton (29 July 1847 – 7 January 1932), married at the Palace of Westminster, London, 8 November 1869 George Spencer-Churchill, 8th Duke of Marlborough, and had issue, divorced 20 November 1883
Lord Ronald Douglas Hamilton (17 March 1849 – November 1867)
Lady Maud Evelyn Hamilton (17 December 1850 – 21 October 1932), married at Westminster Abbey, London, 8 November 1869 Henry Petty-Fitzmaurice, 5th Marquess of Lansdowne, and had issue
Lord Cosmo Hamilton (16 April 1853 – 16 April 1853)
Lord Frederick Spencer Hamilton (13 October 1856 – 11 August 1928)
Lord Ernest William Hamilton (5 September 1858 – 14 December 1939)

In 1881, Louisa was invested as a Lady of the Royal Order of Victoria and Albert (3rd class).

Louisa was still living at the time of the birth of her great-great-grandson, the future Prime Minister Alec Douglas-Home, on 2 July 1903. Her other great-great-grandchildren that she lived to see were Lady Patricia Herbert, Mildred Egerton, daughter of Lady Bertha Anson, Louisa's great-granddaughter through her grandson Thomas Anson, 3rd Earl of Lichfield and Guendolen Wilkinson, daughter of Lady Beatrix Herbert, Louisa's great-granddaughter through her granddaughter Lady Beatrix Lambton.

Death
The Duchess of Abercorn died at Coates Castle, Coates, West Sussex, England on Friday, 31 March 1905, aged 92. She survived her husband by almost twenty years.

She was interred on 5 April 1905, in Chenies, Buckinghamshire; she left an estate worth over £24,000.

Titles, honours, and awards
 8 July 1812 – 25 October 1832: The Lady Louisa Jane Russell
 25 October 1832 – 10 August 1868: The Most Honourable The Marchioness of Abercorn
 10 August 1868 – 1881: Her Grace The Duchess of Abercorn
 1881 – 31 October 1885: Her Grace The Duchess of Abercorn, VA
 31 October 1885 – 31 March 1905: Her Grace The Dowager Duchess of Abercorn

Ancestry

References

External links
 

Ladies of the Royal Order of Victoria and Albert
British duchesses by marriage
Daughters of English dukes
People from West Sussex
Wives of knights
1812 births
1905 deaths